Vítězslav Sedlák (born 5 February 1991) is a Czech darts player and a member of the team Mustang Knínice.

Career
Vítězslav started playing darts at the age of 18.

In soft-tip darts he managed to win twice in TOP tournament of National Grand Prix and twice on Grand Prix itself. In 2019 he represented Czech Republic in European championship and won the title.

In steel darts, his biggest achievement so far is a victory in Czech Cup in 2020.

In early 2020, he took part in PDC European Q-school, three times he was eliminated in 256, once in last 64. That was in Day 4 and he lost 3–5 to the BDO world number one, Richard Veenstra from the Netherlands. In April 2020 he became one of the ten players of newly found 2020 Tipsport Premier League.

References

External links

1991 births
Living people
Czech darts players